Mülheimer Dramatikerpreis ("dramatist award of Mülheim"), founded in 1976, is one of the leading theater awards in Germany. It is awarded by an open jury of theater professionals, critics and playwrights who watch a short list of productions during the Stücke festival; the productions are not the full play but a piece, often the first act. The short list is chosen by a jury from plays that were first performed in Germany during the prior season. The winner receives .

Winners

1976 Franz Xaver Kroetz – Das Nest
1977 Gerlind Reinshagen – Sonntagskinder
1978 Martin Sperr – Die Spitzeder
1979 Heiner Müller – Germania – Tod in Berlin
1980 Ernst Jandl – Aus der Fremde
1981 Peter Greiner – Kiez
1982 Botho Strauß – Kalldewey, Farce
1983 George Tabori – Jubiläum
1984 Lukas B. Suter – Schrebers Garten
1985  – Das alte Land
1986 Herbert Achternbusch – Gust
1987 Volker Ludwig – Linie 1
1988 Rainald Goetz – Krieg
1989 Tankred Dorst – Korbes
1990 George Tabori – Weisman und Rotgesicht
1991 Georg Seidel – Villa Jugend
1992 Werner Schwab – Volksvernichtung oder Meine Leber ist sinnlos
1993 Rainald Goetz – Katarakt
1994 Herbert Achternbusch – Der Stiefel und sein Socken
1995 Einar Schleef – Totentrompeten
1996 Werner Buhss – Bevor wir Greise wurden
1997 Urs Widmer – Top Dogs
1998 Dea Loher – Adam Geist
1999 Oliver Bukowski – Gäste (Tragödie)
2000 Rainald Goetz – Jeff Koons
2001 René Pollesch – world wide web-slums
2002 Elfriede Jelinek – Macht nichts
2003 Fritz Kater – Zeit zu lieben Zeit zu sterben
2004 Elfriede Jelinek – Das Werk
2005 Lukas Bärfuss – Der Bus (Das Zeug einer Heiligen)
2006 René Pollesch Cappuccetto Rosso
2007 Helgard Haug / Daniel Wetzel (Rimini Protokoll) Karl Marx: Das Kapital, Erster Band
2008 Dea Loher – Das letzte Feuer
2009 Elfriede Jelinek – Rechnitz (Der Würgeengel)
2010 Roland Schimmelpfennig – Der goldene Drache in the production of the Wiener Burgtheater
2011 Elfriede Jelinek – Winterreise
2012 Peter Handke – Storm Still (Immer noch Sturm)
2013 Katja Brunner – von den beinen zu kurz
2014 Wolfram Höll – Und dann
2015 Ewald Palmetshofer – die unverheiratete
2016 Wolfram Höll – Drei sind wir
2017 Anne Lepper – Mädchen in Not
2018 Thomas Köck – paradies spielen (abendland. ein abgesang)
2019 Thomas Köck – atlas
 2020 canceled due to the COVID-19 pandemic
 2021  – Tragödienbastard

References

External links
Mülheimer Dramatikerpreis, official website 

German theatre awards
Awards established in 1976
1976 establishments in West Germany